Yevhen Vitaliyovych Budnik (born September 4, 1990) is a Ukrainian professional footballer who plays as a forward for Asteras Vlachioti.

Career

Arsenal Kharkiv
Budnik is a youth product of Arsenal Kharkiv and played for the club in the Ukrainian Second League.

Metalist Kharkiv
Budnik then moved to Metalist Kharkiv where he initially played for the reserves team. He went on to play 11 games and score 4 goals in the 2008–09 season. In the 2009–10 season he played 29 games, scoring 4 goals. The 2010–11 season was even more successful for Budnik, who was one of the top goalscorers of the season, with 13 goals in 25 games.
Budnik was promoted to Metalist's main team for the 2011–12 season.

FCI Levadia 
On 28 January 2019, Budnik signed a two-year contract with Estonian club FCI Levadia. He was released from the club in June 2019.

Pyunik 
On 1 March 2021, Budnik signed for Pyunik from Urartu.

References

External links 
 Profile at UAF Official Site
 
 

1990 births
Living people
Ukrainian footballers
Footballers from Lutsk
Association football forwards
Ukrainian expatriate footballers
Ukrainian expatriate sportspeople in the Czech Republic
Ukrainian expatriate sportspeople in Belarus
Ukrainian expatriate sportspeople in Austria
Ukrainian expatriate sportspeople in Greece
Ukrainian expatriate sportspeople in Estonia
Ukrainian expatriate sportspeople in Armenia
Expatriate footballers in the Czech Republic
Expatriate footballers in Belarus
Expatriate footballers in Austria
Expatriate footballers in Greece
Expatriate footballers in Estonia
Expatriate footballers in Armenia
Expatriate footballers in Indonesia
Ukrainian Premier League players
Ukrainian Second League players
Meistriliiga players
Armenian Premier League players
FC Arsenal Kharkiv players
FC Metalist Kharkiv players
FC Vorskla Poltava players
FC Slovan Liberec players
FC Stal Kamianske players
FC Dinamo Minsk players
Kapfenberger SV players
Platanias F.C. players
PAS Lamia 1964 players
FCI Levadia Tallinn players
FC Urartu players
Persita Tangerang players
FC Karpaty Lviv players
Asteras Vlachioti F.C. players
Ukraine under-21 international footballers